Presidential elections were held in Finland on 16 January 2000, with a second round on 6 February.

The result was a victory for Tarja Halonen of the Social Democratic Party, who became the country's first female President. During the elections Halonen was the incumbent Minister for Foreign Affairs. President Martti Ahtisaari had indicated in January 1999 that he would accept the Social Democratic Party's nomination for the 2000 presidential elections, but only if no presidential primary was held. However, Jacob Söderman announced his candidacy at the start of April 1999, and during the final week of that month, Ahtisaari announced that he would not seek the Social Democratic presidential candidacy. In his memoirs, Ahtisaari claims that Tarja Halonen badly wanted to become President, a claim that Halonen has denied.

There were three other female presidential candidates in 2000: Riitta Uosukainen of the National Coalition, Elisabeth Rehn of the Swedish People's Party, and Heidi Hautala of the Greens.  Halonen's popularity rose significantly during the last few months before the first round of the 2000 presidential elections, while Uosukainen's and Rehn's popularity declined. Former Prime Minister Esko Aho, the Centrist presidential candidate, emerged as the second most popular candidate. Halonen received votes from women across party lines, and she was partly helped by her lack of a major left-wing opponent, and by her reputation as a tolerant, human rights-oriented person. The election was decided by slightly over 100,000 votes, and the voter turnout was much higher than in the 1996 municipal elections or in the 1999 parliamentary elections.

Results

By province

First pound

Second round

References

2000
Finland
2000
January 2000 events in Europe
February 2000 events in Europe